The 2003 South Kesteven District Council election took place on 1 May 2003 to elect members of South Kesteven District Council in Lincolnshire, England. The whole council was up for election and the Conservative party gained control of the council from no overall control.

Background
Before the election the Conservatives had half of the seats on the council with 29 councillors, compared to 14 independents, 12 Labour and 3 Liberal Democrats. The Conservatives ran the council in alliance with the Liberal Democrats, with Linda Neal taking over as leader of the council from Phil Taylor in 2002.

96 candidates stood for the 58 seats on the council over 34 wards, 15 fewer candidates than at the 1999 election. In 11 wards there was no election as the candidates for those seats were elected without opposition. The Conservatives stood 42 candidates, compared to 20 for Labour, 19 independents, 13 Liberal Democrats and 2 candidates for the Green party.

Election result
The Conservatives gained two seats to take an overall majority on the council with 31 councillors. This came at the expense of the independents and Labour, who both lost two seats to have 12 and 10 councillors respectively. Meanwhile, the Liberal Democrats picked up two seats to have 5 councillors. Overall turnout at the election was 29.65%, around 3% less than in 1999.

The successful candidates included five married couples, Labour's Dorrien and Neil Dexter, Fereshteh and John Hurst and Avril and Mike Williams, as well as Conservatives Margery and Norman Radley and Graham and Mary Wheat. Conservative gains included picking up a seat in Bourne East, but they did lose three seats to the Liberal Democrats in Stamford St John's. In Stamford St George's the second seat for the ward was decided by the toss of a coin and had Conservative Bob Sandall defeat Liberal Democrat Ray Lee.

Ward results

By-elections between 2003 and 2007

Greyfriars

All Saints

Earlesfield

St Anne's
Labour won a by-election in St Anne's ward after the death of councillor Fred Burrows. Labour candidate Lee Steptoe was unopposed after the Conservative candidates papers were found to be invalid, while the Liberal Democrats were unable to find the required 10 seconders.

Market and West Deeping

Truesdale

References

South Kesteven District Council elections
2003 English local elections